The Joint Faculty of Intensive Care Medicine of Ireland (JFICMI) is the organisation involved with the training, assessment, practice and continuing professional development of intensive care physicians in Ireland.

It was launched on 16 December 2008 by agreement between four parent organisations: the College of Anaesthetists of Ireland (CAI; now the College of Anaesthesiologists of Ireland), the Royal College of Surgeons in Ireland (RCSI), the Royal College of Physicians of Ireland (RCPI), and the Intensive Care Society of Ireland. It took over the roles of the Irish Board of Intensive Care Medicine which had previously been formed in 1994. In 2017 the faculty's governance structures were revised, meaning that it became a faculty of the CAI reporting to that body's council, but that it would remain a "joint faculty" in that it would continue to have representation at board level from the RCSI and RCPI.

References

Medical associations based in Ireland
Medical education in Ireland
2008 establishments in Ireland